Winterthur is a city in the Canton of Zürich, Switzerland.

Winterthur may also refer to:

FC Winterthur, a football club in Winterthur, Switzerland
Winterthur Group, a multinational insurance company originally founded in Winterthur, Switzerland
Winterthur Museum, Garden and Library, a museum in Winterthur, Delaware
EHC Winterthur, an ice hockey team in Winterthur, Switzerland
Orchester Musikkollegium Winterthur, an orchestra based in Winterthur, Switzerland